Bruce M. Clark (March 31, 1957) is a former American college and professional football player who was a defensive end in the Canadian Football League (CFL) and National Football League (NFL) for ten seasons during the 1980s.  Clark played college football at Penn State University, where he was an All-American.  He was the fourth pick overall in the 1980 NFL Draft, but chose to play for the CFL's Toronto Argonauts before joining the NFL's New Orleans Saints and Kansas City Chiefs.

Early years

Clark was born in New Castle, Pennsylvania.

College career

Clark attended Penn State University, where he played for coach Joe Paterno's Penn State Nittany Lions football team from 1976 to 1979.  As a junior in 1978, Clark became the first junior to win the Lombardi Award as the best college defensive lineman.  He was recognized a consensus first-team All-American as a senior in 1979.

Professional career

The Green Bay Packers selected Clark in the first round (fourth pick overall) of the 1980 NFL Draft, but he refused to play for them, and instead joined the Toronto Argonauts of the CFL.

He later played a single season for the World League of American Football's Barcelona Dragons. Clark was drafted in the first round of the supplemental draft by the Barcelona Dragons in 1991.  His experience and leadership were key to the Dragons successful first season.  Clark started all ten games and was co-leader in sacks with seven that season.

External links
Penn State player page
NFL.com player page

1957 births
Living people
All-American college football players
American football defensive ends
American players of Canadian football
Barcelona Dragons players
Canadian football defensive linemen
Green Bay Packers players
Kansas City Chiefs players
National Conference Pro Bowl players
New Orleans Saints players
People from New Castle, Pennsylvania
Penn State Nittany Lions football players
Players of American football from Pennsylvania
Toronto Argonauts players
Detroit Drive players
National Football League replacement players